Saint-Appolinard may refer to the following places in France:

 Saint-Appolinard, Isère, a commune in the Isère department
 Saint-Appolinard, Loire, a commune in the Loire department